Þingeyri (regionally also ) is a settlement in the municipality of Ísafjarðarbær, Iceland.

It is located on the coast of Dýrafjörður fjord in the mountainous peninsula Westfjords (in Icelandic written Vestfirðir). On 1 January 2019, it had a population of 246. It has an airport.

Continually inhabited since 1787, Þingeyri is one of the oldest settlements in the Westfjords and the first trading post established there. It is believed to derive its name from a medieval assembly (þing)  and has ruins of a medieval booth believed to have been used by visitors to the assembly.

Thanks to its sheltered location Þingeyri developed into a significant fishing center. In the 19th century the French applied for permission to establish a base there to support their fishing operations in the area but were turned down. 

From 1884-98, the town served as the base for American halibut fishing in the region. In 1909 a hospital was founded in the village and in 1910-1911 a church was established. In 1957 an airport for medical transport, with a runway of 300×20 meters, was taken into use.

In 1995, the inhabitants of Þingeyri voted in favor of a merger with Ísafjörður, Suðureyri, Mýrahreppur, Mosvallahreppur and Flateyri to form the new municipality of Ísafjarðarbær. Of the six municipalities involved, Þingeyri had the lowest rate of approval for the merger with 130 voting in favor and 71 voting against.

The nearby mountain of Sandafell, accessed by driving or hiking, is a tourist destination known for its scenic view.

Climate
Based on the climate data for the most recent reference period, Þingeyri has a subpolar oceanic climate (Köppen Cfc) or a continental subarctic climate (Köppen Dfc), depending on the isotherm used.

Notes

References
 Dóra Hafsteinsdóttir and Sigríður Harðardóttir (eds.) (1990). Íslenska alfræðiorðabókin P-Ö. 1990. Reykjavík: Örn og Örlygur hf.
 Guðrún Edda Gunnarsdóttir. Þingeyrarkirkja. From the Þingeyri official website. Last accessed October 12, 2007.
 Harding, Paul (2004). Iceland. 
 Leffman, David and James Proctor (2004). The Rough Guide to Iceland. 
 Simmonds, Jane (1999). Iceland.

External links
 Þingeyri official website

Populated places in Westfjords